England national under-18 football team, also known as England under-18s or England U18(s), represents England in association football at under-18 age level and is controlled by the Football Association, the governing body for football in England. The team is coached by Neil Ryan.

The team competed in the FIFA International Youth Tournament (later taken over by UEFA) and its successor, the UEFA European Under-18 Championship, and was often referred to as England Youth. After the tournament was renamed the European Under-18 Championship, England won twice more, in 1980 and 1993. In 1997, eligibility rules changed and the competition was rebranded as the UEFA European Under-19 Championship in 2001. 

Nowadays, the under-18 banner is used for participation in international friendlies. The 2017 Toulon Tournament was also composed largely of under-18 players.

Players

Latest squad
For the 2022–23 season, players born on or after 1 January 2005 are eligible. Players born between January and August 2005 are second-year scholars in the English academy system, players born between September 2005 and August 2006 are first-year scholars.

The following players were named in the squad for games against Croatia, Belgium and Switzerland, to be played between 22-27 March 2023.

Names in italics denote players who have been capped by England in a higher age group.

Recent call-ups
The following players have previously been called up to the England under-18 squad and remain eligible.

Honours
FIFA International Youth Tournament
Winners: 1948

UEFA International Youth Tournament
Winners: 1963, 1964, 1971, 1972, 1973, 1975
Runners-up: 1958, 1965, 1967

UEFA European Under-18 Championship
Winners: 1980, 1993

References

17
European national under-18 association football teams